Dadar Parsi Colony (officially Mancherji Joshi Parsi Colony) is an upper class Parsi colony in midtown South Mumbai. It is situated in the locality of Dadar-Matunga. Unlike the other Parsi colonies (also known as '', literally gardens) it is not surrounded by a wall or fence and is not isolated from its surroundings. The colony houses the famous Five Gardens created by Mancherji Joshi, a renowned Parsi. 

It is the largest Zoroastrian enclave in the world and in 2009, out of the 45,000 Zoroastrians living in Mumbai, 10,000 lived in Dadar Parsi Colony.

History

This area was established for Parsis through the efforts of Mr Mancherji Edalji Joshi, the founder of the Dadar Parsi Colony (M Joshi Colony).
The area was built by the British under the Dadar-Matunga-Wadala-Sion scheme of 1899-1900, the first planned  scheme in Mumbai. The Bombay City Improvement Trust formulated this plan in order to relieve congestion in the centre of the town, following the Mumbai plague epidemics of the 1890s. According to the survey plan, 60,000 people were to be housed at Dadar-Matunga and an equal number in Sion-Matunga. 85,000 people were to be accommodated in the developments in Sewri-Wadala.

The plans regulated constructions with emphasis on proper sanitation. No building was to be more than three storeys high, and the buildings were to have open spaces between them. The land-use was planned to be a mix of residential, commercial and institutional constructions. Parks and gardens were planned, and the streets were well laid out.

 of land was procured and leased to the government for selling. For the first time in 1922, housing cooperatives were formed to take advantage of newly developed land. The Parsi and Hindu colonies in Dadar were developed in this way in the 1920s.

The tramways were extended here. The GIP constructed a bridge, now the Tilak Bridge, connecting the two  railways. Soon, in February 1925, the GIP Railways opened their line, and started the work of electrifying the railways. Among the institutions which moved here according to the BCIP plan were the VJTI, the Sydenham College of Commerce and Wadia Vachha now known as J.B.Vachha high school for Parsi girls.

This posh colony in south Mumbai is home to an estimated 15,000 or more Parsis, which is by far the largest concentration of Parsis in Mumbai, and possibly the world.

Education
The Dadar Parsi Youth Assembly and J.B. Vachha High School lies in this vicinity.

References
Dadar, Matunga, Wadala, Sion {GFDL}

Neighbourhoods in Mumbai
Zoroastrianism in India